Alimentation Couche-Tard Inc., or simply Couche-Tard, is a Canadian multinational operator of convenience stores. The company has 14,302 stores across Canada, the United States, Mexico, Ireland, Norway, Sweden, Denmark, Estonia, Latvia, Lithuania, Poland, Russia, Japan, China, and Indonesia. The company operates its corporate stores mainly under the Couche-Tard, Circle K, and On the Run brands but also under the affiliated brands
Mac's Convenience Stores, go!(Go Store), 7-jours, Dairy Mart, Becker's and Winks.

Founded by current chairman Alain Bouchard, the corporation is based in Laval, Quebec, Canada, a suburb of Montreal. The flagship Couche-Tard and Mac's stores, as well as some older Winks outlets, prominently feature a distinctive anthropomorphic red, winking owl. This mascot, named "Jandrice", was inherited from the Provi-Soir / Winks chain when it was absorbed in the late 1990s.

In French, "couche-tard" means "(the type of person who) goes to bed late", with connotations very similar to "night owl" in English.

History 
Alain Bouchard opened his first convenience store in 1980 in Laval. In 1985, Bouchard acquired 11 "Couche-Tard" branded stores in the Quebec City area which he merged with its existing stores in the Montreal area to rename the whole company "Alimentation Couche-Tard". In 1987, the company purchased the 7 Jours chain from Metro-Richelieu, which Couche-Tard has kept a separate chain to this day.

The chain's current status in Quebec is the result of the consolidation of several major convenience store chains in the province during the 1990s. In 1994, Couche-Tard, already a significant convenience-store operator in Quebec, acquired the La Maisonnée from Steinberg and Perrette chains, as well as Mac's stores in Quebec. The combined chain was subsequently rebranded "Dépan-Escompte Couche-Tard". To better reflect the new Depan-Escompte Couche-Tard trademark, a piggy bank mascot was introduced and replaced the previous Couche-Tard sleepwalker mascot from the late 1980s and early 1990s. In May 1997, Couche-Tard acquired  C Corp, a subsidiary of Provigo that owned the chains Provi-Soir in Quebec, Winks in Ontario and Red Rooster in Alberta. In early 1999, Dépan-Escompte Couche-Tard and Provi-Soir merged to create the chain in its current branding; reverting to the old Couche-Tard name without "Dépan-Escompte" (albeit with a new logotype), but adopting the owl mascot of Provi-Soir. The company has since revived the Provi-Soir name in Quebec which it keeps as a distinct chain, much like the 7 Jours division. The new Provi-Soir, basically a combination of rebranded Couche-Tard and 7 Jours locations, does not feature the owl mascot from the original chain and its logotype is completely different than in its last incarnation.

Similarly, Silcorp had consolidated several of the largest Ontario convenience-store chains, such as Mac's and Becker's, under its ownership before being itself acquired by Couche-Tard. As in Quebec, other corporate banners such as Becker's and Mike's Mart are slowly being phased out in favour of the dominant Mac's brand, although new franchised stores are still being opened under the Winks and Daisy Mart brands.

In 2001, Couche-Tard broke into the American market with the acquisition of 172 Bigfoot convenience stores from Johnson Oil Company of Columbus, Indiana.

After making some tentative moves in the U.S. under the Mac's brand in the early 2000s, Couche-Tard acquired the Circle K chain from ConocoPhillips in 2003, promptly rebranding its existing U.S. locations to the better-known Circle K moniker. The Circle K brand is also franchised in Asia and elsewhere.

Couche-Tard held the master franchise for Dunkin' Donuts in Quebec since August 2003, but agreed in August 2008 to terminate this franchise within 12 to 18 months.

In early 2010, Couche-Tard started consolidating its outlets in Quebec by closing down many of those that did not do well in sales, and therefore allowing the successful ones to prosper. In all, over 300 stores were closed from 2010 through 2012.

In 2014, Couche-Tard sold off its Tiendas Extra chain, a subsidiary of Circle K, in Mexico to Grupo Modelo.

In 2015, Manulife Bank of Canada reached a deal with Couche-Tard to add its ATMs to 830 locations.

On September 23, 2015, Couche-Tard announced that it would relaunch the Circle K brand, and extend it to all of its stores in English Canada, the United States, and Scandinavia. The rebranding did not include its stores in Quebec, which remained under the Couche-Tard brand.

On August 29, 2016, the purchase of 53 Cracker Barrel convenience stores in Louisiana for an undisclosed price was announced. As in the case with most of its other acquisitions, the Cracker Barrel chain would also be converted to Circle K stores. The acquired chain stores all have gas stations, with the exception of one location, and 12 have quick-serve restaurants. The Cracker Barrel chain is unrelated to the restaurant chain of the same name.

In July 2017, Couche-Tard announced an agreement to acquire Holiday Stationstores, the 18th largest convenience store chain in the United States, with over 500 locations in 10 states.

In August 2020, Couche-Tard was out-bid by 7-Eleven's US$21 billion acquisition of 3900 Speedway locations from Marathon Petroleum.

In July 2021, Couche-Tard announced a deal to purchase the 226 retail gasoline/convenience stores and marine fuel terminal of Truro, Nova Scotia-based Wilson Fuel for an undisclosed amount, pending approval by the Competition Bureau. That deal closed on March 1, 2023.

Recent and current operations
In Canada, there are 581 corporate stores in Quebec under the names Couche-Tard, Provi-Soir and Dépanneur 7 jours as well as 298 affiliated stores. In Ontario, there are 702 corporate stores and 214 affiliated stores, and in Western Canada, 305 corporate stores and 71 affiliates operated under the names Mac's, Mike's Mart, Becker's (operated independently), Daisy Mart, and Winks. Locations outside of Quebec have been rebranded as Circle K stores (excluding Becker's).

The brands operated by Couche-Tard are:

 Circle K: the group's primary brand, used internationally.
 Holiday Stationstores: American brand, referred to as the Northern Tier region.
 Couche-Tard: Quebec brand
 Ingo: European brand
 On the Run: international (retired brand)
 Becker's: Ontario (retired brand)
 Mac's: Canada (retired brand)
 Kangaroo Express (retired brand)
 Topaz: Ireland (retired brand)

Irving Oil stores
Many Couche-Tard locations are gas stations co-branded with Irving Oil. The first stage of this partnership began in 2001 in Quebec. Both companies contributed locations to the partnership: some had convenience stores that previously operated under Irving's "Marché Mainway" banner, while others previously sold fuel under the Couche-Tard brand. All these locations now have Couche-Tard convenience stores and Irving-branded fuel.

The partnership expanded in 2008, as Irving leased its remaining Bluecanoe and Mainway convenience stores to Couche-Tard, expanding the latter chain's reach into Atlantic Canada and New England under the Circle K brand. Irving continues to own the buildings and property, and supplies Irving-branded fuel to these stations.

On the Run stores
In the United States, approximately 470 On the Run stores are owned or franchised by Alimentation Couche-Tard under an agreement with ExxonMobil announced April 29, 2009. This also includes 43 ExxonMobil stations in the Phoenix, Arizona market, all of which have been rebranded to Circle K. While many On the Run stations in the United States still sell Exxon or Mobil gasoline, some franchised locations sell other brands not associated with ExxonMobil.

Circle K 

Circle K is an international chain of convenience stores owned by Alimentation Couche-Tard. The brand is the flagship international brand of the company, and has largely replaced other brands previously used or acquired by the company.

Couche-Tard 
Couche-Tard is the original brand of Alimentation Couche-Tard. The brand is present only in Québec along with Provi-Soir and Dépanneur 7 jours. In 2021, Couche-Tard underwent a rebranding to align it with the Circle K brand identity.

Casey's General Stores
In March 2010, Couche-Tard offered $1.9 billion for control of the Iowa-based Casey's General Stores chain, and later announced a proxy fight for control. Casey's rejected Couche-Tard's offer and was successful in September 2010 in retaining its board of directors vs. Couche-Tard's nominated slate.

Statoil
On April 18, 2012, it became known that Couche-Tard had agreed to buy Norway's Statoil Fuel and Retail (previously owned by Statoil) for $2.8 billion, giving Couche-Tard the largest chain of petrol stations in Scandinavia and with a presence around the Baltic region, Poland, and Russia. On June 20, 2012, Statoil Fuel and Retail's shareholders voted in favor (+91.56%) of the acquisition and later it was declared that Couche-Tard had finally acquired 100% of Statoil Fuel and Retail for approximately 2.8 billion $US (forcing the minority shareholders to sell their shares). This acquisition added over 2,853 stores to Couche-Tard's portfolio and a mega-presence in Europe. Alain Bouchard planned to grow this newly acquired chain all over Europe. In 2016, all Statoil stations were rebranded to Circle K.

Imperial Oil retail 
On March 8, 2016, Couche-Tard announced it had agreed to purchase Imperial Oil's Esso retail locations in Ontario (228 locations) and Quebec (50 locations) for $2.8 billion. The stations' convenience stores would be re-branded as Circle K in Ontario, and all would remain supplied by Esso.

CST Brands 
On August 22, 2016, Couche-Tard agreed to buy American company CST Brands and its 2,000 stores, mostly in Texas and other southern states, for $3.78 billion, $4.4 billion including debt. This deal, which was the largest purchase in their history, officially closed on June 28, 2017. Couche-Tard has announced that it will sell around 45% of the new stores to another company to pass competition laws. CST Holdings was based in San Antonio and employed over 14,000 people at the 2,000 stores Couche-Tard took over. The stores acquired were mostly in the southwestern and southeastern United States, with a small presence in New York and Eastern Canada, operating under the Corner Stores, Flash Foods, and Nice N Easy Grocery Shoppes brands. Most locations were rebranded to the Circle K brand after the acquisition.

Due to competition concerns, most of CST's Ultramar operations in Canada were not included in the deal, which were sold off separately to Parkland Fuel Corporation.

Other transactions 
In January 2021, Couche-Tard and Carrefour SA announced that they are looking at operational partnerships after takeover talks were abandoned.

References

External links

 

 
Companies based in Laval, Quebec
Companies listed on the Toronto Stock Exchange
Convenience stores of Canada
Canadian brands
Retail companies established in 1980
1980 establishments in Quebec
S&P/TSX 60